Trapped is a 30-minute American dramatic television mystery series that was broadcast on WOR-TV in New York City. Harvey Marlowe directed and packaged the program, which debuted on September 8, 1950.

References

External links
Trapped at CVTA

1950s American anthology television series
1950 American television series debuts
1950 American television series endings
First-run syndicated television programs in the United States